is a railway station in Kuromatsunai, Suttsu District, Hokkaidō, Japan.

Lines
Hokkaido Railway Company
Hakodate Main Line Station S30

Layout
Kuromatsunai Station has a single side platform (platform 1) and an island platform (platform 2,3) connected by an overpass.

Platforms
 Platforms

Surrounding area
 Kuromatsunai Town Ofiice
 Kuromatsunai Onsen
 Niseko Bus "Kuromatsunai Station" Bus Stop

Adjacent stations

Railway stations in Japan opened in 1903
Railway stations in Hokkaido Prefecture